Velik Nikolov Kapsazov (15 April 1935 – 27 March 2017) was a Bulgarian gymnast. He competed at the 1956, 1960 and 1964 Summer Olympics in all artistic gymnastics events, and shared a bronze medal in the rings in 1960 with Takashi Ono. This was the first Olympic medal for Bulgaria in gymnastics.

Kapsazov retired following the 1964 Olympic Games and became a coach. He died 27 March 2017, aged 81.

References

1935 births
2017 deaths
Bulgarian male artistic gymnasts
People from Asenovgrad
Gymnasts at the 1956 Summer Olympics
Gymnasts at the 1960 Summer Olympics
Gymnasts at the 1964 Summer Olympics
Olympic gymnasts of Bulgaria
Olympic bronze medalists for Bulgaria
Olympic medalists in gymnastics
Medalists at the 1960 Summer Olympics
Universiade medalists in gymnastics
Universiade bronze medalists for Bulgaria
Medalists at the 1961 Summer Universiade
European champions in gymnastics
20th-century Bulgarian people
21st-century Bulgarian people